Purgatory is a 2014 Spanish horror thriller film directed by Pau Teixidor in his feature debut which stars Oona Chaplin alongside Sergi Méndez, Andrés Gertrúdix, and Ana Fernández.

Plot 
After installing in her new residence with her partner Carlos, Marta sees herself forced to look after Daniel, her neighbor's son, whilst Carlos is doing a night shift. Daniel, otherwise displaying an erratic behaviour, claims that there is another kid hidden in the house that only he is able to see.

Cast

Production 
The film is an Apaches Entertainment, Atresmedia Cine, and CINE365 production, and it had the participation of Orange, Vértice 360 and Tres60. It was shot in Seseña in December 2013.

Release 
The film premiered at the Málaga Film Festival's main competition in March 2014. Distributed by Renoir and CINE365, it was theatrically released in Spain on 4 April 2014. The film was also selected for screening at the 2014 Fantastic Fest.

Reception 
Jonathan Holland of The Hollywood Reporter assessed that the "high-atmosphere, low-event psychological horror debut" features "plenty of claustrophobic atmosphere and a committed central performance [that] can't make up for Purgatorys failure to exploit its material".

Manuel Piñón of Cinemanía rated the film 3½ out of 5 stars, considering that Chaplin manages to uplift the film "from being a more than adequate exercise in style" to "an intense experience, a passage through terror in which you never want to let go of her hand".

Pere Vall of Fotogramas rated the film 3 out of 5 stars deeming it to be more of a suspense film than a horror film, citing its "forays into adolescent sexuality" as a positive element.

Accolades 

|-
| align = "center" | 2015 || 24th Actors and Actresses Union Awards || Best Film Actress in a Secondary Role || Ana Fernández ||  || align = "center" | 
|}

See also 
 List of Spanish films of 2014

References 

Films shot in the province of Toledo
2014 horror films
Spanish horror films
2010s Spanish-language films
2014 thriller films
Spanish thriller films
Atresmedia Cine films
2010s Spanish films